Amwell may refer to:

Places

Hertfordshire, England 
 Great Amwell near Ware in East Hertfordshire
 Little Amwell, now part of Hertford Heath, East Hertfordshire
 Amwell, St Albans, a hamlet in the parish of Wheathampstead

United States 
 Amwell Township, Pennsylvania
 Amwell Township, New Jersey, since subdivided into:
West Amwell Township, New Jersey
East Amwell Township, New Jersey
Amwell, New Jersey, an unincorporated community on the eastern border of East Amwell Township
 Amwell Valley, a valley in Hunterdon County, New Jersey

Businesses
 Amwell Valley Vineyards, later renamed Old York Cellars
 Amwell (company), a telemedicine company formerly known as American Well